Carina Olsson (born 26 August 1955; in marriage also known as Carina Björk) is a Swedish female curler.

In 2018 she was inducted into the Swedish Curling Hall of Fame.

Teams

References

External links
 

Living people
1955 births
Swedish female curlers
World curling champions
European curling champions
Swedish curling champions